Paltamo (also ) is a municipality of Finland. It is part of the Kainuu region. The municipality has a population of 
which 
is water. The population density is
. There are two built-up areas in the municipality: Kontiomäki and Paltamo. Kontiomäki has about 600 inhabitants.

The municipality is unilingually Finnish.

History

Paltamo was first inhabited 8,500 years ago. The most sophisticated finding yet has been a weapon shaped like a bear's head. In 1552 king Gustav Vasa gave an order in which the areas of the Lake Oulu were to be inhabited. 140 families left there. In 1555 it was counted that there were 133 families living in Paltamo. The picture church of Paltamo was built in 1726 by Johan Simonpoika Knubb. It was the fourth church on the site. One of the most important persons in the Finnish history of literature – Eino Leino – was born in Hövelö in 1878. Today Paltamo is one of the slowly declining municipalities of Finland.

Heraldry
The word paltamo means a tar boat in the Finnish language, which is the reason the coat of arms of Paltamo has three black tar boats on a golden background.

See also
 Finnish national road 22
 Paltaniemi

References

External links

Municipality of Paltamo – Official website 
Clickable map of Paltamo municipality

 
Municipalities of Kainuu